The Battle of Andros took place on 29 April 1825 at Andros between the fleets of the Ottoman Empire and Revolutionary Greece. The Greek fleet, under Georgios Sachtouris, comprising 20 warships and eight fireships, defeated the Ottoman fleet of 51 vessels by attacking and burning with two fireships the Ottoman flagship—a 66-gun ship of the line—and a 34-gun frigate.

The Ottoman fleet dispersed, allowing the Greeks to capture a sloop with its crew, as well five Austrian cargo ships destined to support the Ottoman Siege of Missolonghi.

References

Andros 1825
History of Andros
Andros
April 1825 events